Karel Burkert (1 December 1909 in Újpest – 26 March 1991) was a Czechoslovak football goalkeeper who played for Czechoslovakia in the 1938 FIFA World Cup.

References

External links
 
 
 
 Profile and stats at LevskiSofia.info 
 

Czechoslovak footballers
Czechoslovakia international footballers
Association football goalkeepers
1938 FIFA World Cup players
1909 births
1991 deaths
Footballers from Budapest
People from the Kingdom of Hungary
Bulgaria international footballers
Bulgarian footballers
Dual internationalists (football)